The Harvesters is an oil painting on wood completed by Pieter Bruegel the Elder in 1565. It depicts the harvest time, in the months of July and August or late summer. Nicolaes Jonghelinck, a merchant banker and art collector from Antwerp, commissioned this painting.

Painting
The painting is one in a series of six (or perhaps twelve) works, five of which are still extant, that depict different times of the year. As in many of his paintings, the focus is on peasants and their work and does not have the religious themes common in landscape works of the time. Pears can be seen on the white cloth in front of the upright sitting woman who eats bread and cheese while a figure in the tree to the far right picks pears. The painting shows a large number of activities representative of the 16th-century Belgian rural life. For example, on the far right a person is shaking apples from the tree. In the center left of the painting, a group of villagers can be seen participating in the blood sport of cock throwing. The painting has been at the Metropolitan Museum of Art in New York City since 1919. The Metropolitan Museum of Art calls this painting a “watershed in the history of Western art” and the “first modern landscape”. A sense of distance is conveyed by the workers carrying sheaves of wheat through the clearing, the people bathing in the pond, the children playing and the ships far away.

Cycle
The surviving Months of the Year cycle are:The Gloomy Day, The Hunters in the Snow, and The Return of the Herd are on display in the Kunsthistorisches Museum in Vienna. The Hay Harvest is on display in the Lobkowicz Palace in Prague.

Legacy
Legendary animation director, Hayao Miyazaki took inspiration from this painting for his short film Mr. Dough and the Egg Princess.

References

Further reading

  (fig. 3)

External links
 The Harvesters by Pieter Bruegel the Elder: a family guide from The Metropolitan Museum of Art Libraries (fully available online as PDF)

1565 paintings
Paintings in the collection of the Metropolitan Museum of Art
Paintings by Pieter Bruegel the Elder
Farming in art
Food and drink paintings